Dorsum Oppel is a wrinkle ridge at  in Mare Crisium on the Moon.

The ridge trends north from Yerkes crater. Peirce and Swift craters lie to the east of the Dorsum.

References 

Oppel